Attila Ferjáncz (12 July 1946 – 23 April 2016) was a Hungarian rally driver. He won the Hungarian Rally Championship series from 1976 to 1982 and in 1985 and 1990. In 2000, he was awarded the Knight's Cross of the Hungarian Order of Merit.

References

External links
Profile at ewrc-results.com

1946 births
2016 deaths
Hungarian rally drivers
Knight's Crosses of the Order of Merit of the Republic of Hungary (civil)
Sportspeople from Budapest